= Bezbeli Apstraklije =

Bosnian punk-rock band

- Also known as: BA
- Origin: Sarajevo, Bosnia & Herzegovina
- Genres: Rock Punk
- Years active: 2014–present
- Members: Haris Ljumanović; Berin Tuzlić; Haris Kadenić
- Website: bezbeliapstraklije.com

Bezbeli Apstraklije is a Bosnian punk rock band from Sarajevo, formed in 2014, which already created distinctive pop-rock sound with elements of Psychedelic music. The band consist of Haris Ljumanović a.k.a. "Turbo Avaz" (vocals, guitar), Berin Tuzlić a.k.a. "Estamlija" (drums) and Haris Kadenić a.k.a. "Bassistaga" (bass).

In September 2014 Bezbeli Apstraklije released their first album "Kad je bal nek je kanibal" consisting of twelve songs. It was published by Croatia Records.
